Social media as a news source is the use of online social media platforms rather than moreover traditional media platforms to obtain news. Just as television turned a nation of people who listened to media content into watchers of media content in the 1950s to the 1980s, the emergence of social media has created a nation of media content creators. Almost half of Americans use social media as a news source, according to the Pew Research Center.

As a participatory platform that allows for user-generated content and sharing content within one's own virtual network, using social media as a news source allows users to engage with news in a variety of ways, including:

 Consume news
 Discover news
 Share or repost news
 Post their own photos, videos, or reports of news (i.e., engage in citizen or participatory journalism)
 Comment on news
Using social media as a news source has become an increasingly more popular way for old and young adults alike to obtain information. There are ways that social media positively affects the world of news and journalism but it is important to acknowledge that there are also ways in which social media has a negative affect on the news that people consume such as false news, biased news, and disturbing content.

Relationship to traditional news sources 
Unlike traditional news platforms such as newspapers and news shows, social media platforms, such as Facebook, Twitter, Instagram, Snapchat, and WhatsApp, allow people without professional journalistic backgrounds to create news and cover events that news agencies might not cover.

Social media users may read a set of news that differs slightly from what newspaper editors prioritize in the print press. A 2019 study found Facebook and Twitter users are more likely to share politics, public affairs, and visual media news. Social media users may circulate more negative news. A study of tweets found that while optimistic-sounding and neutral-sounding tweets were equally likely to express certainty or uncertainty, the pessimistic tweets were nearly twice as likely to appear certain of an outcome than uncertain. These results could imply that posts of a more pessimistic nature that are also written with an air of certainty are more likely to be shared or otherwise permeate groups on Twitter. A similar bias towards negativity has developed on Facebook, where internal memos revealed that an algorithm built to promote "meaningful social interaction" actually incentivized publishers to promote negative and sensational news. Biases towards negativity need to be considered when the utility of new media is addressed, as the potential for human opinion to over-emphasize any particular news story is greater despite general improvement.

In order to compete in this rapidly changing technological environment, there has been an upheaval of traditional news sources onto online spaces. The production and circulation of newspaper prints have continued to globally decline in accordance with the increasing presence of news outlets on social media. Prominent platforms such as Twitter and Facebook have been key in engaging users through the integration of journalistic news into their newsfeeds. This feature has now become a foundational part of these apps' interfaces.

Social media incentivizes both legacy news brands and individual professional journalists to share their reporting and interact with audiences on social platforms to boost engagement. However, most people who consume news on social media report that accessing news is not their main motivation for being on social media, but rather, they see and consume news incidentally. Nonetheless, informational interviews reveal that these consumers rely on being informed through social media. Some news consumers attest that a news brand's participation in social media does not improve their trust in the brand and that more in-depth reporting and more transparency about biases would improve trust instead.

Use as a news source by adults 
Globally, data from 2020 shows that over 70% of adult participants from Kenya, South Africa, Chile, Bulgaria, Greece, and Argentina utilized social media for news while those from France, the UK, the Netherlands, Germany, and Japan were reportedly less than 40 percent.

According to the Pew Research Center, 20% of adults in the United States in 2018 said they get their news from social media "often," compared to 16% who said they often get news from print newspapers, 26% who often get it from the radio, 33% who often get it from news websites, and 49% who often get it from TV. The same survey found that social media was the most popular way for American adults age 18–29 to get news, the second-to-last most popular way for Americans age 20–49 to get news, and the least popular way for American adults age 50-64 and 65+ to get the news.

In 2019, the Pew Research Center found that over half of Americans (54%) either got their news "sometimes" or "often" from social media, and Facebook was the most popular social media site where American adults got their news. However, at least 50% off all respondents reported that the following were either a "very big problem" or a "moderately big problem" for getting news on social media:

 One-sided news (83%)
 Inaccurate news (81%)
 Censorship of the news (69%)
 Uncivil discussions about the news (69%)
 Harassment of journalists (57%)
 News organizations or personalities being banned (53%)
 Violent or disturbing news images or videos (51%)

In a later survey from the same year, the Pew Research Center reported that 18% of American adults reported that the most common way they get news about politics and the election was from social media.

Additional source information shows that from politics and the United States presidential election in 2016, the popularity of fake news had grown to global attention. With this information, the study explains that more than 60 percent of adults receive their news form social media, the most popular being Facebook. With the increase of fake news, and the large amount of adult participation on these social media sites, it made it much harder for those who were searching for news to find a source that they could find credible.

Another study found that adult participants found their own friends on Facebook to be a more reliable source of information online compared to a professional news organization. Although, when news was posted by a news organization online, they were then found more reliable compared to when they are shared by their online friends. Showing that adult participants found that the news that was only posted on Facebook and social medias was much more credible to them than compared to other forms of information spreading. The study further explains that these outcomes have the potential explanation that motivation played a part in the ways they were affected. Motivation meaning that what the news topic was about. This could have affected the way adult participants interacted with the different news sources, such as their online friends compared to a news organization, prominently because depending on the story, they want to have the correct information about the news from the most credible source.

Used as a news source by young people 
Globally, there is evidence that through social media, youth have become more directly involved in protests, social campaigns  and generally, in the sharing of news across multiple platforms.

The amount of people who use social media platforms such as Twitter, Facebook, Instagram, or Snapchat as ways to seek information has increased significantly in recent years especially for people who are part of the younger generation. Source information shows that one third of people aged 18 to 24 use social media as their primary source of news. This number of social media users who utilise social media for news is more than online news sites and television news and printed news combined.

In the United States, Common Sense Media conducted a 2020 nationally representative survey of American teens (ages 13–18) that found that the most common way teens got the news was from personalities, influencers, and celebrities followed on social media or YouTube (39%), despite trusting this type of news source less than other forms, such as local newspapers or local TV news networks. The most commonly mentioned sources on social media or YouTube included PewDiePie, Trevor Noah, CNN, Donald Trump, and Beyoncé. 

This popularity of using social media as a news source in the United States is consistent with previous data. Based on interviews with 61 teenagers, conducted from December 2007 to February 2011, most of the teen participants from American high schools reported reading print newspapers only "sometimes," with fewer than 10% reading them daily. The teenagers instead reported learning about current events from social media sites such as Facebook, MySpace, YouTube, and blogs.

Use as a news source across race, gender and political demographics 
Just as variances occur in social media usage rates between different age demographics, similar variances occur across different racial, gender, and political demographics.

A 2021 study from PEW Research Center reported that White adults are the leading users (62%) of both Facebook and Reddit as a news source but make up less than half (40%) of this population on Instagram. Instagram is the platform that accounts for the largest proportion of Black and Hispanic adult news users, boasting 22% and 27% of these demographics respectively.

A separate study from the year prior found that Black and Hispanic social media users are the most likely to consider social media platforms to be valuable news sources. 60% of Black users and 53% of Hispanic users reported that they held social media to be “very important” or “somewhat important” to their involvement with political and social issues that are important to them, in contrast to the 37% of White social media users from the same poll.

In terms of gender variances, the initial article highlights the likelihood of Facebook news users to identify as female, totalling 65% of the overall population compared to the 35% reported to identify as male.

Differences in social media news usage across political demographics correlate to the overall partisan usage rates attributed to each platform. An April 2021 PEW Research Center report found that 77% of Democrat/Democrat-leaning individuals admitted to using social media, compared to the 68% attributed to their Republican/Republican-leaning counterparts.These numbers closely align with the 2021 report, which found that there is no social media platform in which social media news users are more likely to be Republican/Republican leaning.

Effects on individual and collective memory 
The ability to accurately recall where one learned something is fundamental for evaluating its reliability or accuracy, or for being able to find the information at a later date. The integration of news on social media can result in the confusion of sourcing. For example, people misidentified certain televised advertisements that seemed like news, as actual news about 70% of the time. A study published in March 2020 examined how different generations are able to remember the content and source of information they read on social media and traditional news sources. The study found that content read on social media was remembered better by both younger and older generations than traditional news content. The study also found that when the content and format of a news headline do not match one another, the participants were less likely to remember the source information. The adults in the older generation were more likely to think that a news headline was from a traditional source rather than a social media post. Therefore, it is not uncommon for people to forget where one found a piece of information, especially when that information was read on social media. These findings suggest that the disappearance of boundaries that exist between traditional news sources and social media platforms has possible implications for peoples memories on the source of information they are reading.

News media and television journalism have been a key feature in the shaping of American collective memory for much of the twentieth century. Indeed, since the United States' colonial era, news media has influenced collective memory and discourse about national development and trauma. In many ways, mainstream journalists have maintained an authoritative voice as the storytellers of the American past. Their documentary style narratives, detailed exposes, and their positions in the present make them prime sources for public memory. Specifically, news media journalists have shaped collective memory on nearly every major national event – from the deaths of social and political figures to the progression of political hopefuls. Journalists provide elaborate descriptions of commemorative events in U.S. history and contemporary popular cultural sensations. Many Americans learn the significance of historical events and political issues through news media, as they are presented on popular news stations. However, journalistic influence is growing less important, whereas social networking sites such as Facebook, YouTube and Twitter, provide a constant supply of alternative news sources for users.

As social networking becomes more popular among older and younger generations, sites such as Facebook and YouTube, gradually undermine the traditionally authoritative voices of news media. For example, American citizens contest media coverage of various social and political events as they see fit, inserting their voices into the narratives about America's past and present and shaping their own collective memories. An example of this is the public explosion of the Trayvon Martin shooting in Sanford, Florida. News media coverage of the incident was minimal until social media users made the story recognizable through their constant discussion of the case. Approximately one month after the fatal shooting of Trayvon Martin, its online coverage by everyday Americans garnered national attention from mainstream media journalists, in turn exemplifying media activism. In some ways, the spread of this tragic event through alternative news sources parallels that of Emmett Till – whose murder by lynching in 1955 became a national story after it was circulated in African-American and Communist newspapers.

Societal examples 
On October 2, 2013, the most common hashtag throughout the United States was "#governmentshutdown", as well as ones focusing on political parties, Barack Obama, and healthcare. Most news sources have Twitter, and Facebook, pages, like CNN and the New York Times, providing links to their online articles, getting an increased readership. Additionally, several college news organizations and administrators have Twitter pages as a way to share news and connect to students. According to "Reuters Institute Digital News Report 2013", in the US, among those who use social media to find news, 47% of these people are under 45 years old, and 23% are above 45 years old. However social media as a main news gateway does not follow the same pattern across countries. For example, in this report, in Brazil, 60% of the respondents said social media was one of the five most important ways to find news online, 45% in Spain, 17% in the UK, 38% in Italy, 14% in France, 22% in Denmark, 30% in the U.S., and 12% in Japan. Moreover, there are differences among countries about commenting on news in social networks, 38% of the respondents in Brazil said they commented on news in social network in a week. These percentages are 21% in the U.S. and 10% in the UK. The authors argued that differences among countries may be due to culture difference rather than different levels of access to technical tools.

An influential example of social media making news more accessible and widely spread is the Arab Spring. Protesters used social media platforms, to create plans for in person protests and to spread video and images captured from the events that were created online.

Rainie and Wellman have argued that media making now has become a participation work, which changes communication systems. The center of power is shifted from only the media (as the gatekeeper) to the peripheral area, which may include government, organizations, and out to the edge, the individual. These changes in communication systems raise empirical questions about trust to media effect. Prior empirical studies have shown that trust in information sources plays a major role in people's decision making. People's attitudes more easily change when they hear messages from trustworthy sources. In the Reuters report, 27% of respondents agree that they worry about the accuracy of a story on a blog. However, 40% of them believe the stories on blogs are more balanced than traditional papers because they are provided with a range of opinions. Recent research has shown that in the new social media communication environment, the civil or uncivil nature of comments will bias people's information processing even if the message is from a trustworthy source, which bring the practical and ethical question about the responsibility of communicator in the social media environment.

The case study on the 2013 urban protests in Brazil reflects how digital communication form a new type of e-democracy in mass societies. The case study reveals how Brazilians used social media to organize manifestations regarding cost of public transportation, violence, homophobia, and corruption. The young population dominated the demonstrations. They posted videos and pictures on WhatsApp chat groups, created online events on Facebook, and gathered over 250.000 protestors on the streets. Consequently, Brazilians were able to modify functions in an institutionalized system, not only by promoting awareness on certain social problems, but also by inducing president Dilma Rousseff's impeachment in 2016.

Implications of Using Social Media as a News Source 
Using non-traditional platforms such as social media as a news source is an easy way to gain access to numerous different types of information such as gossip blogs, sporting events, political matters, and business affairs. Using social media as a news outlet helps relieve the hardships of navigating through several websites and articles to find one source with information pertaining to the topic being explored. However, using social media as a news gateway also presents several implications which can be challenging to guide through. Some of the most current issues regarding using social media as a news source are:

 Spreading of false news 
 The "news finds me" perception
 Biased news articles  
 News containing disturbing image or video content

The spread of fake news has become a complex challenge for social media platforms to mediate. False information is being spread by individual social media users and companies and organizations who use social media to communicate with their audience. Approximately 23% of social media users have reported that they have spread fake news, and fake news spreads faster than true news on social media, primarily because people share it amongst others. In today's day and age, almost 62% of adults get their news from social media platforms and that number is increasing. There are two distinctions between news found on social media and traditional journalism. The first is that any user can create news on social media, regardless if it is fake or real. Then others are able to share it and spread that information to others rapidly. The second distinction is that the majority of social media platforms present news feeds to their users. The feeds consist of a mix of news from friends, followers, sources based on past activities or interactions and from advertisers who pay to have their content on users' feeds.

Social media platforms such as Facebook, Instagram, and Twitter have begun implementing fact-checking tools to ensure that the shared content is accurate and factual. However, this moderated news is not always done promptly and can take several days before being reviewed. According to a study published in the article "Understanding Patterns of Covid Infodemic: A Systematic and Pragmatic Approach to Curb Fake News," the author states that "based on the analysis of 225 pieces of fake news identified by fact-checking tools, Brennen, Simon, Howard, and Nielsen (2020) indicated that 20% of them were shared by politicians, celebrities, and other public figures". With so much of this false information being shared by trusted politicians and honourable authorities such as doctors, there becomes a stress factor for users to decide who is trustworthy.

In recent times, research has been focused on the growing “news finds me” perception, which is the phenomenon that comes as a result of individuals trusting in social media algorithms and reposted content to provide them with all the relevant news they need. The primary causes of concern surrounding this phenomenon are the loss of contextualization and reliance on peers that characterize it.

Another implication that social media as a news source has introduced is the rise in biased news. In recent studies, it has been stated that social media users tend to create an environment in which the pages and users they follow only reflect and reinforce the opinions of their own. This phenomenon is referred to as an echo chamber and is fueled by confirmation bias. Research has found that “it is possible to determine the political leanings of a Twitter user by simply looking at the partisan preferences of their friends”. When social media users rely on these networking platforms for their daily news sources, it is possible that they are only receiving information that is a reflection of what they want to see in society, further implicating the matter by ignoring issues that require being addressed.

Social media can and cannot be a reliable source for information. False news is not strongly regulated on social media platforms therefore it is easy and widely accessible for anyone to post and for many more people to consume that information that has been released.

Another common issue that has risen through the use of social media as a news platform is mixing information and altering or exaggerating a story or event. Social media being such an open, diverse and accessible place to display information has made it an easy way for information to be altered and changed, which can lead to false news and can even be dangerous depending on the target audience. Along with how common false news is on social media platforms, media is also consumed and retired at an alarming rate. Often times headlines on social media are quickly discarded and it is very challenging to keep a subject relevant.

Journalism and social media

North American Journalist Code of Ethics 
The Society of Professional Journalists (SPJ) represents American journalists and the Canadian Association of Journalists (CAJ) advocate for Canadian journalists. Both of these organizations have set ethical standards that journalist should follow in order to preserve their professional integrity. These codes of ethics are as follows:

 As a journalist, you must be accurate, just, and diverse. Information should be gathered, reported, and interpreted by journalists in an honest and courageous manner.
 The goal of ethical journalism should be to minimize harm and respect their sources, subjects, colleagues, and members of the public
 Journalists should act independently; their main priority should be that of serving the public
 Transparency in ethical journalism means explaining to the public one's decisions and taking responsibility for your work.

Digital journalism 
The CAJ makes note of how these codes of ethics should still apply to digital media. The general recommendations made about digital media and journalism are as follows:

 Regardless of the medium where journalist publish or broadcast stories, they must adhere to their ethical guidelines.
 Blogging, social media posts, and all other online content should be carefully considered, and misinformation should never be re-posted.
 Journalist should never compromise a piece of work's credibility, accuracy, or fairness in order to publish a story faster online.
 Information that is put online can be considered as public, journalists should always ask permission, verify the information, and always source properly.
 Journalists should be mindful when using social media for personal use. Anything that is said can affect credibility or cause a conflict of interest.

Journalist's use of social media 
The spread of news has become increasingly dependent on websites such as blogs, YouTube, Twitter, and Facebook. These platforms are reliant on brief and fast content in order to keep the interest of their users, therefore quantity is better than quality. Journalists face more challenges because of all the information that comes through these unofficial networks. They need to filter through all so that their work can still be reliable, but they still face the pressure to produce more content and faster than traditional news. Journalists can accomplish their tasks more efficiently with social media tools  but journalists must be wary of how their actions while using these tools can affect their audiences. Journalists have an impact on the conduct of society by the way citizens perceive their work and the journalism industry. With the constant evolution of the internet and the growing need for social media in the workplace, the work of journalists and their practices are also changing. Traditionally, when collecting the publics opinion, journalists ask participants questions and participants are aware of what is being asked of them, and by whom, but with the rise of social media, journalists are able to collect public information without social media users knowing or consenting. For example, when journalists quote social media posts, it may be seen as an invasion of privacy since the usernames are sometimes used to identify the individuals being quoted. These practices become questionable to their audiences; it depends on what they believe is suitable social media behaviour. The use of social media as a journalistic source may also be taken out of context and misinterpreted which in turn misrepresents the public. People who are unsure about whether journalists can reliably make claims using social media may question the value and integrity of the journalists' reports. The media and media news source, such as journalists must present information that is trustworthy.

Social media guidelines for journalists 
The Agence France-Presse (AFP) and The New York Times both encourage their journalists to use social networking platforms because it can create relationships with their readers, help them make new contacts, and even reach a greater audience. Both organizations have created guidelines for their journalists to follow. Journalists may have professional accounts in which they clearly state where they work, their posts should reflect those of the company, and they should not share any partisan opinions. Journalists are allowed to have a private personal account, but they should still be careful of what they post, like, or comment.

References 

Social media
Mass media